Albero III of Kuenring, born 1115/18 and died 15 August 1182, was a ministerialis from the noble house of Kuenring in Austria. He was the first-born son of Albero I of Kuenring, who died around 1118.

Issue
Albero married a woman named Elizabeth and she gave him two children:
Hadmar II of Kuenring
Gisela (died after 1192), who married Leutwin of Sonnberg (died after 1190/92)

References

1182 deaths
Austrian nobility
Ministeriales